The Haud (also Hawd), formerly known as the Hawd Reserve Area is a plateau situated in the Horn of Africa consisting of thorn-bush and grasslands. The region includes the southern part of Somaliland as well as the northern and eastern parts of the Somali Region of Ethiopia. Haud is a historic region as well as an important grazing area and has multiple times been referenced in countless notorious poems. The region is also notorious for its red soil, caused by the soil's iron richness. The Haud covers an estimated area of about 119,000 square km (or 46,000 square miles), more than nine-tenths the size of England, or roughly the size of North Korea.

Overview
 
The Haud is of indeterminate extent; some authorities consider it denotes the part of Ethiopia east of the city of Harar. I.M. Lewis provides a much more detailed description, indicating that it reaches south from the foothills of the Golis and Ogo Mountains. "The northern and eastern tips lie within the Somali Republic, while the western and southern portions (the later merging with the Ogaden plateau) form part of the Harari Province of Ethiopia." For decades it (as well as the entire Ogaden) has been an area of conflict and controversy. The eastern portion of Haud is traditionally referred to as Ciid. Due to its lack of permanent wells except to its west, the region is for the most part uninhabited during the dry season (January to April) when the nomads cross into Somaliland for grazing.

The British exerted control of the Ogaden beginning in 1941 as part of the Anglo-Ethiopian Agreement, administering the Haud as part of the British Somaliland protectorate, although Ethiopian sovereignty was still recognized in the area. This region was defined in the 1942 agreement as including the Ethiopian territory within a continuous belt of Ethiopian territory 25 miles [40km] wide contiguous to the frontier of French Somaliland running from the frontier of Eritrea to the Franco-Ethiopian Railway. Thence south-west along the railway to the bridge at Haraua. Thence south and south-east, excluding Gildessa, to the north-eastern extremity of the Garais Mountains and along the crest of the ridge of these mountains to their intersection with the frontier of the former Italian colony of Somalia. Thence along the frontier to its junction with British Somaliland.

Topography 
The terrain of the Haud consists mainly of plains. The plateau is covered by a characteristic red sand, which conceals solid rocks like Nubian, Lower and Middle Eocene limestones as well as gypseous shales. In the Sool region there is a central area consisting of Middle Eocene anhydrite.

The region is largely covered by bushes, with many species of Acacia and other trees that measure up to 6-10 metres in height with much grass. There is also vast stretches of bush-less grassy plains referred to as ban in Somali. The region is filled with anthills rising up to 7 metres in height.

Flora and fauna 
The region is home to a wide variety of fauna including lions, leopards, cheetahs, hyenas and jackals, as well as many species of antelopes, wart-hogs and a wide array of other smaller animals. The Haud is also home to the Somali ostrich, which is endemic to the region.

Cessation to Ethiopia 
In 1948, under pressure from their World War II allies and to the dismay of Somalis, the British signed the Anglo-Ethiopian Agreement and returned the Haud and the Somali Region to Ethiopia, based on the earlier Anglo-Ethiopian treaty they signed in 1897 in which the British ceded Somaliland territory to the Ethiopian Emperor Menelik in exchange for his help against raids by Somali clans. Britain included the proviso that the Somali residents would retain their autonomy, but Ethiopia immediately claimed sovereignty over the area. This prompted an unsuccessful bid by Britain in 1956 to buy back the Somaliland territory that it had turned over (which some presume was a "protectorate" by British treaties with the Somali clans in 1884 and 1886).

Haud delegation 
In response to the cessation of Haud Reserve and the Ogaden regions to Ethiopia in the year 1948, the fifth Grand Sultan of the Isaaq, Abdillahi Deria, led a delegation of politicians and Sultans, including the Habr Awal Sultan Sultan Abdulrahman Sultan Deria and political activist and heavyweight Michael Mariano of the Habr Je'lo, to the United Kingdom in order to petition and pressure the government to return them.

In Imperial Policies and Nationalism in The Decolonization of Somaliland, 1954-1960, Historian Jama Mohamed writes:The N.U.F. campaigned for the return of the territories both in Somaliland and abroad. In March 1955, for instance, a delegation consisting of Michael Mariano, Abokor Haji Farah and Abdi Dahir went to Mogadisho to win the support and co-operation of the nationalist groups in Somalia. And in February and May 1955 another delegation consisting of two traditional Sultans (Sultan Abdillahi Sultan Deria, and Sultan Abdulrahman Sultan Deria), and two Western-educated moderate politicians (Michael Mariano, Abdirahman Ali Mohamed Dubeh) visited London and New York. During their tour of London, they formally met and discussed the issue with the Secretary of State for the Colonies, Alan Lennox-Boyd. They told Lennox-Boyd about the 1885 Anglo-Somali treaties. Under the agreements, Michael Mariano stated, the British Government 'undertook never to cede, sell, mortgage or otherwise give for occupation, save to the British Government, any portion of the territory inhabited by them or being under their control'. But now the Somali people 'have heard that their land was being given to Ethiopia under an Anglo-Ethiopian Treaty of 1897'. That treaty, however, was 'in conflict' with the Anglo-Somali treaties 'which took precedence in time' over the 1897 Anglo-Ethiopian Treaty[.] The British Government had 'exceeded its powers when it concluded the 1897 Treaty and ... the 1897 Treaty was not binding on the tribes.' Sultan Abdillahi also added that the 1954 agreement was a 'great shock to the Somali people' since they had not been told about the negotiations, and since the British Government had been administering the area since 1941. The delegates requested, as Sultan Abdulrahman put it, the postponement of the implementation of the agreement to 'grant the delegation time to put up their case' in Parliament and in international organizations.

Demography 
The Haud is primarily inhabited by the Isaaq clan-family, most notably the Garhajis, Habr Awal, Habr Je'lo and Arap clans, and is part of the wider clan-family's core traditional territory. Several subclans of the Darod clan are also present in the region, most notably the Ogaden, Jidwaaq, Dhulbahante and Majerten subclans.

Notable towns in Haud 

 Rabaso
 Aware
 Buhodle
 Gashamo
 Daroor
 Harshin
 Hartashekh
 Danot

See also
 Somali Acacia–Commiphora bushlands and thickets, the ecoregion that includes the Haud.

Notes

Further reading
Theodore M. Vestal, "Consequences of the British Occupation of Ethiopia During World War II".
Leo Silberman, Why the Haud was ceded, Cahiers d'études africaines, vol. 2, cahier 5 (1961), pp. 37–83.

regions of Ethiopia
Geography of Ethiopia
20th century in Ethiopia
20th century in Somaliland
Geography of Somaliland